NoordNed Personenvervoer B.V. (English translation Network North) was a public transport company operating trains and buses in the north and northeast of the Netherlands. Founded in 1999 as a joint venture by Arriva and Nederlandse Spoorwegen, after Arriva took full ownership in 2003, the brand was retired in 2005.

History

NoordNed was established by Arriva and Nederlandse Spoorwegen, each having a 49% shareholding. In May 1999 it commenced operating regional train services on the Leeuwarden to Harlingen and Leeuwarden to Stavoren lines. It also operated rail services between Leeuwarden and Groningen on behalf of Nederlandse_Spoorwegen.

On 28 May 2000 it commenced operating services between Groningen and Nieuweschans, and Roodeschool under a five year concession.

In December 2003, Arriva became the sole owner. In December 2005, NoordNed commenced operating 15 year contracts in Groningen and Friesland. In December 2005 the NoordNed brand was retired with all operations merged with Arriva's other Netherlands operations.

References

External links

Arriva Group companies
Nederlandse Spoorwegen
Railway companies established in 1999
Railway companies disestablished in 2005
Railway companies of the Netherlands
Rail transport in Friesland
Rail transport in Groningen (province)
1999 establishments in the Netherlands
2005 disestablishments in the Netherlands